The eastern smooth frog (Geocrinia victoriana), or Victorian smooth froglet, is a species of frog in the family Myobatrachidae.
It is endemic to Australia.

References

External links
 

Geocrinia
Amphibians of New South Wales
Amphibians of Victoria (Australia)
Taxonomy articles created by Polbot
Amphibians described in 1888
Frogs of Australia